Alice Kaboyo is a Ugandan politician. She is the current State Minister in the Office of the Prime Minister for Luweero Triangle and Rwenzori Region. She is the former State House aide.

Background 
She is a cousin to the First Lady and Minister of Education and Sports, Janet Museveni.

Political career 
During her visit to Kiruhura, Kaboyo emphasized the importance of entrepreneurship in reducing poverty, promote gender equality, and empower women.

Controversies 
Before Kaboyo became the minister, her appointment was rejected over integrity and corruption issues. However, her name was returned to the Parliament for approval. The Appointments Committee was chaired by Deputy Speaker Anita Among who rejected Alice's appointment on the basis of her conviction by the Anti-Corruption Court in 2012. She was charged for abuse of office when she got involved in a corruption scandal on funding from the Global Alliance for Vaccines and Immunization (GAVI). She was charged with three former health ministers, Jim Muhwezi, his deputies, Mike Mukula and Alex Kamugisa.

References

External links 
 Website of the Parliament of Uganda

Living people
Women members of the Parliament of Uganda
Members of the Parliament of Uganda
Year of birth missing (living people)